Ledisi Anibade Young (born March 28, 1972), better known simply as Ledisi, is an American R&B and jazz recording artist, songwriter, music producer, author and actress. Her name means "to bring forth" or "to come here" in Yoruba.

In 1995, Ledisi formed a band after her middle name Anibade. After unsuccessfully trying to get signed to a major label, she formed LeSun Records with Sundra Manning. Ledisi and Sundra decided to release Ledisi's debut album entitled Soulsinger (black and white cover on the LeSun Music independent label) featuring the song "Take Time", which gained substantial airplay from San Francisco area radio stations.

In 2002, Ledisi re-released her first album, titled Soulsinger: The Revival under Tommy Boy Records., featuring a bonus track with Grammy Award Winner Meshell Ndegeocello on bass. Ledisi also released her second album, Feeling Orange but Sometimes Blue, which won "Outstanding Jazz Album" at the California Music Awards.

In 2005, Ledisi signed a record deal with Verve Forecast and released her third album, titled Lost & Found, on August 28, 2007; it sold almost 217,000 copies and earned her two Grammy nominations, including one for Best New Artist. In 2008, Ledisi released her Christmas album, It's Christmas.

In 2009, Ledisi released her fourth album Turn Me Loose, which earned her two Grammy nominations, followed by her fifth album Pieces of Me (2011) which debuted on the US Billboard 200 album chart at number eight, becoming the first top-ten album of her career and her highest-charting album to date. It also garnered three Grammy nominations at the 54th Grammy Awards including for Best R&B Album. In 2013, she received a nomination for Best R&B Performance at the 55th Grammy Awards for her collaboration with fellow R&B and jazz musician Robert Glasper for the album cut "Gonna Be Alright" from his fifth album Black Radio (2012). In 2014, she released her sixth album The Truth to critical acclaim and moderate sales, subsequently followed by albums Let Love Rule (2017), The Wild Card (2020) and Ledisi Sings Nina (2021), all of which have earned varying degrees of chart success and multiple Grammy Award nominations. Since releasing her debut Soulsinger in 2000, Ledisi has released eleven studio albums and earned fourteen Grammy Award nominations to date, winning her first for Best Traditional R&B Performance for "Anything For You" in 2021.

Aside from music, Leidsi has embarked a career in film and television as an actress. She portrayed gospel icon Mahalia Jackson in the films Selma (2014) and Remember Me: The Mahalia Jackson Story (2022). Other roles include a guest appearance as Patti LaBelle in the BET docudrama American Soul, a cameo appearance as a choir member in the FX drama Pose (both 2020), as well as co-starring as Gladys Knight in the upcoming film Spinning Gold (2023). She is also set to star in her first Hallmark original movie All Saints Christmas (2022).

Early life
Ledisi was born in New Orleans and was raised in Oakland, California. Ledisi first began performing publicly at age eight with the New Orleans Symphony Orchestra. Ledisi moved to Oakland, California, where she attended McChesney Junior High School, now Edna Brewer Middle School.

She was shy about her singing abilities and would sing only upon request when students in her gym class would implore her to sing Deniece Williams's version of Black Butterfly, bringing the entire classroom audience under the spell of her very mature, melodious voice. As she sang more publicly her music career blossomed and she earned a scholarship to study opera and piano for five years at University of California Berkeley in their Young Musicians Program. Right after graduating from high school she was nominated for a Shellie award for her performance in a production of The Wiz That nomination would lead her to be a long time cast member with the San Francisco cabaret, Beach Blanket Babylon.

While working at Beach Blanket Babylon, Ledisi worked at a record shop and waited tables part-time. It was not until she began performing regularly at local clubs like Cafe DuNord, The Elbo Room, Bruno's, Mecca, and Rasselas that she began making a name for herself in the local club scenes in the Bay Area.

Musical career

1995–1999: Career beginnings
In 1995, Ledisi formed a band called Anibade, won acclaim in the San Francisco Bay Area with a cult-like following of die-hard fans who referred to themselves as "Ledheads" and meet her with love at every event, singing along verbatim to songs that though unrecorded at the time, were well known by their fans. During this time, Ledisi met keyboardist Sundra Manning and recorded an album "Soulsinger" and shopped it around to a many major labels, all of them turned her down.

2000–2003: Soulsinger and Feeling Orange but Sometimes Blue
In January 2000, Ledisi released her first album, Soulsinger, independently on her label, LeSun Records. The album had fan favorites, "Soulsinger", "Take Time", "Get Outta My Kitchen", and "Good Lovin'". After the release of Soulsinger, Ledisi began performing outside of the Bay Area.

In 2002, Ledisi released her second album, Feeling Orange but Sometimes Blue, which was also released independently. The album featured the singles "Feeling Orange but Sometimes Blue" and "Autumn Leaves". In 2003, Ledisi won "Outstanding Jazz Album" forFeeling Orange but Sometimes Blue at the California Music Awards.

Also in 2002, Ledisi re-released Soulsinger as Soulsinger:The Revival, on Tommy Boy Records.

2006–2008: Lost & Found
In 2006, she signed with Verve and released "Blues in the Night" which featured on the tribute album, We All Love Ella: Celebrating the First Lady of Song.

In August 2007, Ledisi's third album, Lost & Found, was released. Ledisi stated that she was unsure of wanting to stay in the music industry. In response, Ledisi wrote the song "Alright" to express her life. "Alright" became the lead single and debuted at #45 on the Billboard Hot R&B chart. The album's second single, "In The Morning", debuted at #49 on the Billboard Hot R&B chart. Other songs from the album charted but were not released as singles. "Think of You" charted at #71 on the Hot R&B charts, "Joy" charted at #103 on the Hot R&B charts and #29 on the Adult R&B Airplay.

In December 2007, the album earned her two Grammy nominations, including one for Best New Artist. In 2008, Ledisi continued her tour to promote the album, Lost & Found. By January 2009, the album had sold 216,894 copies.

In September 2008, Ledisi released her Christmas album, It's Christmas, which featured the singles "This Christmas" and "Children Go Where I Send Thee". In December 2008. "Have Yourself A Merry Little Christmas" and "Give Love On Christmas Day" charted on the Hot R&B charts at #113.

In 2008, Ledisi performed the song "The Man I Love" as a blues singer in the movie Leatherheads.

2009–2010: Turn Me Loose
In 2009, Ledisi's fourth studio album was announced as Turn Me Loose. The album was released on August 18, 2009. Speaking in April 2010 to noted UK R&B writer Pete Lewis – Deputy Editor of the award-winning Blues & Soul – Ledisi explained the album's title reflected its musical diversity: "The title 'Turn Me Loose' is basically me saying 'I don't wanna be boxed in! Let me be myself as a performer and singer, because I do EVERYTHING! Not just one particular style!'." She employed production from seasoned R&B songwriter-producers such as Raphael Saadiq, Jimmy Jam and Terry Lewis, James "Big Jim" Wright, and Carvin & Ivan. The first single from the album was "Goin' Thru Changes". The second single was "Higher Than This", produced by Jimmy Jam and Terry Lewis and James "Big Jim" Wright.

In 2010, Ledisi made her first television appearance on BET's Blackgirls Rock, with Marsha Ambrosius, Kelly Price and Jill Scott.

2011–2012: Pieces of Me

Ledisi toured with R&B/soul singer Kem on his North American INTIMACY Tour. On March 10, 2011, during her opening act in Atlanta, Georgia, Ledisi announced that she had finished recording her fifth studio album, Pieces of Me, on March 9, 2011. It was released on June 14, 2011. It debuted at number 8 on the Billboard 200 album chart, selling 38,000 copies in its first week. The album's title track served as the album's lead single.

Ledisi headlined her first tour to promote her album, Pieces of Me. The Pieces of Me Tour played to 22 sold-out shows across North America. With this album, she received three nominations for the 2012 Grammy Awards, in the categories Best R&B Album, Best R&B Performance and Best R&B Song, for the album and the lead single "Pieces of Me".

Ledisi released her first book, Better Than Alright: Finding Peace, Love & Power on Time Home Entertainment, Inc. in 2012. The book, an innovative collaboration with ESSENCE, is filled with the singer's personal photos, quotes, lyrics, and richly detailed stories of her journey to acceptance of her beauty, talent, and power.

On April 6, 2012, Ledisi announced her second headlining tour, B.G.T.Y., with Eric Benet serving as an opening act. In December 2012,

2014-2016: The Truth
In March 2014, Ledisi released her new album The Truth in partnership with Essence Magazine and now Grammy Award Winner Robert Glasper was her opening act.

In April 2014, Ledisi was cast to play Mahalia Jackson in the American historical drama film, Selma, directed by Ava DuVernay and written by Paul Webb and DuVernay. It is based on the 1965 Selma to Montgomery marches for voting rights in Alabama, led by James Bevel, Martin Luther King Jr. and Hosea Williams.  In the film and on the official film soundtrack, Ledisi sings "Take My Hand, Precious Lord". Initially slated to perform at the 57th Grammy Awards as part of a tribute to the Selma March alongside Common and John Legend (who performed their Oscar-winning duet "Glory") Ledisi's fan felt she was snubbed by the Recording Academy and recording artist Beyoncé, who performed in her place. Ledisi's snubbing and Beyoncé's performance received mixed reaction from social media. In 2015, she received her ninth Grammy Award nomination for Best R&B Performance for the single "Like This" off of her seventh album The Truth. She lost to Beyoncé and Jay Z for "Drunk in Love".

2017: Let Love Rule
In May 2017, Ledisi released a single titled "High" produced by Darhyl "Hey DJ" Camper and Rex Rideout. Her eighth studio album called Let Love Rule was released on September 22, 2017. In November 2017, she received three more nominations at the 60th Grammy Awards in January 2018 including Best R&B Album, Best R&B Performance and Best Traditional R&B Performance. Ledisi won a Soul Train Award 'Soul Certified Award' for the album.

Ledisi helped the BET Awards pay tribute to Anita Baker, the Lifetime Achievement Award recipient of the night on June 24, with a rendition of the singer's 1986 ode "Sweet Love".

Ledisi was then a part of the Aretha Franklin Tribute that was put together by the annual award ceremony known as Black Girls Rock. Ledisi delivered a rendition of the hit "Ain't No Way".

In October 2018, Ledisi performed with Adam Lambert in an NBC broadcast, A Very Wicked Halloween: Celebrating 15 Years on Broadway, before a live studio audience at the Marquis Theatre in New York, singing "As Long as You're Mine" from Wicked.

2020–present: Listen Back Entertainment/BMG Recordings  The Wild Card  Ledisi Live at The Troubadour and  Ledisi Sings Nina
Ledisi released her second book, Don't Ever Lose your Walk:How to embrace your journey on Chinweya Publishing, Inc on January 3, 2020. This book is part memoir and part self help. Ledisi explains how to navigated through rejection, depression and life while still being graceful with whatever is thrown your way. Ledisi self-published this book with the publishing company she formed with her family.

In June 2020, Ledisi announced the title of her ninth studio album, The Wild Card. The album was released on August 28, 2020, exactly 13 years after her major label debut, Lost & Found. The Wild Card is Ledisi's first release under her independent label Listen Back Entertainment /BMG.

On April 30, 2021, Ledisi released her tenth album and first live recording under her label Listen Back Entertainment, Ledisi Live at The Troubadour. This was the second album Ledisi released with her new label.

Having previously appeared live on August 21, 2019, at the BBC Prom 45 Mississippi Goddam (A Homage to Nina Simone), on July 23, 2021, Ledisi released, Ledisi Sings Nina. This project is a tribute to Nina Simone. Ledisi is supported by the Metropole Orkest conducted by Jules Buckley, and the New Orleans Jazz Orchestra, conducted by Adonis Rose. This album also features Grammy Award winner Lisa Fisher, Lizz Wright and Alice Smith. This project was Ledisi's third project released on her label in almost a year, and her 11th studio recording.

Discography

Studio albums
Soulsinger (2000)
Feeling Orange but Sometimes Blue (2002)
Lost & Found (2007)
Turn Me Loose (2009)
Pieces of Me (2011)
The Truth (2014)
Let Love Rule (2017)
The Wild Card (2020)
Ledisi Sings Nina (2021)

Tours
Pieces of Me Tour (2011)
B.G.T.Y. Tour (2012)
The Truth Tour (2014)
The Intimate Truth Tour (2015)
The Rebel The Soul The Saint Tour with Kirk Franklin, PJ Morton and MAJOR (2017)
Let Love Rule Tour (2018)
Ledisi Live UK Tour (2019)
 Nina and Me Tour (2019) 
The Wild Card Tour (2021)
Soul 2 Soul Tour (2023)

Filmography

Film

Television

Awards and nominations

Grammy Awards

Ledisi has been nominated for fourteen career Grammy Awards, winning her first in the Best Traditional R&B Performance category for "Anything for You" in 2021.

|-
| rowspan="2"| 2008
| Ledisi
| Best New Artist
| 
|-
| Lost & Found
| rowspan="2"| Best R&B Album
| 
|-
| rowspan="2"| 2010
| Turn Me Loose
| 
|-
| "Goin' Thru Changes"
| Best Female R&B Vocal Performance
| 
|-
| rowspan="3"| 2012
| rowspan="2"| "Pieces of Me"
| Best R&B Performance
| 
|-
| Best R&B Song
| 
|-
| Pieces of Me
| Best R&B Album
| 
|-
| 2013
| "Gonna Be Alright (F.T.B.)" (with Robert Glasper)
| rowspan="3"| Best R&B Performance
| 
|-
| 2015
| "Like This"
| 
|-
| rowspan="3"| 2018
| "High"
| 
|-
| "All the Way"
| Best Traditional R&B Performance
| 
|-
| Let Love Rule
| Best R&B Album
| 
|-
| 2021
| "Anything For You"
| Best Traditional R&B Performance
| 
|-
| 2022
| Ledisi Sings Nina
| Best Traditional Pop Vocal Album
| 
|-
|}

BET Awards
2008, BET J Cool Like Dat Award (Nominated)
2018, Dr. Bobby Jones Best Gospel/Inspirational Award - If You Don't Mind feat. Kirk Franklin (Nominated)

BETJ Virtual Awards
2008, Female Artist of the Year (Nominated)

California Music Awards
2003, Outstanding Jazz Album BAY Area Music Awards, Feeling Orange But Sometimes Blue (Won)

Soul Train Music Awards
2011, Centric Award (nominated)
2009, Best R&B/Soul Female Artist (nominated)
2014, Best R&B/Soul Female Artist (Nominated)
2017 Best R&B/Soul Female Artist (Nominated) 
2017 Soul Certified Award (won) 
2018 Soul Certified Award (won)
2020 Soul Certified Award (nominated)

NAACP Awards
2012 Best Female Artist (Nominated)
2014 Best Female Artist (Nominated)
2015 Best Female Artist (Nominated)
2018 Best Female Artist (Nominated) 
2018 Best Traditional song - High (Nominated) 
2018 Best Visual - High (Nominated)
2021 Outstanding Female Artist (Nominated)
2021 Outstanding Music Video- Anything For You (Nominated)
2021 Outstanding Album- The Wild Card (Nominated)
2021 Outstanding Soul R&B Song- Anything For You (Nominated)
2021 Outstanding Duo, Group or Collaboration- Ledisi & PJ Morton Anything For You (Nominated)
2022 Best Jazz Vocal Album - Ledisi Sings Nina (Nominated)

Honors/special awards
2016, NAACP Awards Theatre - Spirit Award Honouree 
2016, America For The Arts - Music Honouree
2020, EmpowerHER - Music Honouree
2022, LA Jazz Society - Jazz Vocalist Honouree

References

External links
 Official website
 https://www.imdb.com/name/nm2958434/

 

1972 births
Living people
American film actresses
African-American women singer-songwriters
Grammy Award winners
Actresses from Louisiana
Singer-songwriters from Louisiana
American neo soul singers
African-American actresses
21st-century American actresses
University of California, Berkeley alumni
American mezzo-sopranos
American gospel singers
American women jazz singers
American jazz singers
American contemporary R&B singers
Ballad musicians
Jazz musicians from Louisiana
African-American Catholics
Verve Records artists
Bertelsmann Music Group artists
21st-century African-American women singers